Tomáš Sedláček (born 29 August 1980) is a professional Czech football player who currently plays for FC Vysočina Jihlava.

References

External links
 

Czech footballers
1984 births
Living people
Czech First League players
FK Mladá Boleslav players
SK Dynamo České Budějovice players
FC Vysočina Jihlava players

Association football forwards